The Kellett Strait is a natural waterway through the central Canadian Arctic Archipelago in the Northwest Territories of Canada. It separates Eglinton Island (to the west) and Melville Island (to the east).  It opens into the McClure Strait to the south, and the Fitzwilliam Strait to the north.

Straits of the Northwest Territories